The 2022 Danilith Nokere Koerse was the 76th edition of the Nokere Koerse one-day road cycling race. It was held on 16 March 2022 as a category 1.Pro race on the 2022 UCI ProSeries calendar.

From the start in Deinze, for the first , the route travelled south and west before heading back north to the finish in Nokere.

Teams 
Ten of the 18 UCI WorldTeams, eight UCI ProTeams, and two UCI Continental teams made up the 20 teams that participated in the race. Of the 133 riders who were entered into the race, two did not start, while 18 did not finish; as a result, 113 riders finished the race.

UCI WorldTeams

 
 
 
 
 
 
 
 
 
 

UCI ProTeams

 
 
 
 
 
 
 
 

UCI Continental Teams

Result

References

Sources

External links 
 

2022
Nokere Koerse
Nokere Koerse
Nokere Koerse